Marcus Vinicius Oliveira Alencar (born 7 April 2003), better known professionally as Marquinhos, is a Brazilian professional footballer who plays as a winger for  club Norwich City, on loan from Premier League club Arsenal.

Club career

São Paulo
Marquinhos made his professional debut for São Paulo on 11 July 2021, coming on as a 78th minute substitute in a 1–0 Série A home win against Bahia.

Arsenal
On 13 June 2022, Marquinhos signed for English club Arsenal on a long-term contract. However, fellow Premier League side Wolverhampton Wanderers were considering taking legal action against both Marquinhos and São Paulo, as Marquinhos had reportedly signed a pre-contract agreement with them prior to joining Arsenal.

On 8 September, Marquinhos made his competitive debut for Arsenal in a 2–1 UEFA Europa League away win over Zürich, where he scored his first goal both for the club and in European competition, and also registered an assist for Eddie Nketiah in the same match. He made his Premier League debut on 18 September, coming on as a late substitute for Bukayo Saka in a 3–0 win at Brentford. His first appearance at the Emirates came on 6 October, in the Europa League game against Bodø/Glimt.

Loan to Norwich City
On 31 January 2023, Marquinhos joined Championship club Norwich City on loan for the rest of the 2022–23 season. He made his debut on 25 February, scoring once and also providing an assist for Gabriel Sara in Norwich's 2–0 win against Cardiff City.

Career statistics

Club

Honours 
São Paulo
 Campeonato Paulista: 2021

References

External links
Marquinhos at the Arsenal F.C. website
Marquinhos at the Premier League website

2003 births
Living people
Brazilian footballers
Footballers from São Paulo
Association football forwards
Brazil youth international footballers
Campeonato Brasileiro Série A players
Premier League players
São Paulo FC players
Arsenal F.C. players
Brazilian expatriate footballers
Brazilian expatriate sportspeople in England
Expatriate footballers in England